Kobylnica Wołoska  (Kobyl’nytsia Volos’ka) is a village in the administrative district of Gmina Wielkie Oczy, within Lubaczów County, Subcarpathian Voivodeship, in south-eastern Poland, close to the border with Ukraine.

Here was born Bishop Petro Kryk, Apostolic Exarch of Germany and Scandinavia for the Ukrainians.

References

Villages in Lubaczów County